Alcohol dehydrogenase [NADP+] also known as aldehyde reductase or aldo-keto reductase family 1 member A1 is an enzyme that in humans is encoded by the AKR1A1 gene. AKR1A1 belongs to the aldo-keto reductase (AKR) superfamily. It catalyzes the NADPH-dependent reduction of a variety of aromatic and aliphatic aldehydes to their corresponding alcohols and catalyzes the reduction of mevaldate to mevalonic acid and of glyceraldehyde to glycerol. Mutations in the AKR1A1 gene has been found associated with non-Hodgkin's lymphoma.

Structure

Gene 
The AKR1A1 gene lies on the chromosome location of 1p34.1 and consists of 10 exons.

Protein 
AKR1A1 consists of 325 amino acids and weighs 36573Da. The tertiary structure consists of a beta/alpha-barrel, with the coenzyme-binding site located at the carboxy-terminus end of the strands of the barrel. Alternative splicing of this gene results in two transcript variants encoding the same protein.

Function 

AKR1A1 gene is found highly expressed in kidney and liver, and moderately expressed in cerebrum, small intestine and testis. Small amounts of AKR1A1 are present in lung, prostate and spleen. However, it is not observed in heart or skeletal muscle. AKR1A1 belongs to the AKR superfamily, which are predominantly monomeric, soluble, NADPH-dependent oxidoreductases involved in the reduction of aldehydes and ketones into primary and secondary alcohols. AKR1A1 is shown to demonstrate characteristically high specific activity towards many aromatic and aliphatic aldehydes, and preferentially catalyses the NADPH-dependent reduction of aliphatic aldehydes, aromatic aldehydes and biogenic amines. It is also reported to be involved in the metabolism of 4-hydroxynonenal and play a role in the resistance to oxidative stress.

Clinical significance 
A SNP in intron 5 of AKR1A1 has been found to be significantly associated with increased risk of non-Hodgkin's lymphoma. AKR1A1 could activate procarcinogens, such as polycyclic aromatic hydrocarbon. AKRs have been linked to metabolism of the anthracyclines doxorubicin (DOX) and daunorubicin (DAUN), allelic variants showed significantly reduced metabolic activities, and hence these allelic variants can possibly act as genetic biomarkers for the clinical development of DAUN-induced cardiotoxicity.

Interactions 
4-hydroxynonenal 

polycyclic aromatic hydrocarbon

DAUN

References

Further reading

External links 
 
 

EC 1.1.1